Haiti has competed at the Pan American Games since its inaugural edition in 1951.

Medal count

Medals by sport

References

 
Pan American Games
1995 in Haitian sport